It's Beautiful Now is a 2022 South Korean television series starring Yoon Shi-yoon, Bae Da-bin, Oh Min-suk, Shin Dong-mi, Seo Bum-june, and Choi Ye-bin. Directed by Kim Seong-geun, the weekend drama depicts the reality of the current generation that are reluctant to get married and have family. It premiered on KBS2 on April 2, 2022 and aired on every Saturday and Sunday at 19:55 (KST) till September 18, 2022.

Synopsis
The series depicts the story of Lee family whose head is Lee Kyung-cheol (Park In-hwan), the grandfather. His son Lee Min-ho (Park Sang-won) and his wife Han Kyung-ae (Kim Hye-ok) have 3 sons. The sons are reluctant to marry, so the elders declare that they would give an apartment to the son who marry within 6 months.

Cast and characters

Main
 Yoon Shi-yoon as Lee Hyun-jae 
36 years old, partner lawyer in law firm Haejun Specializing in family (divorce/inheritance) law and criminal law. A lawyer with a high win rate due to his logical eloquence.
 Bae Da-bin as Hyun Mi-rae
31 years old, eldest daughter, a VIP personal shopper, she asks for an annulment of marriage by saying that she was fraudulently married.
 Oh Min-suk as Lee Yun-jae
 39 years old, a dentist.
 Shin Dong-mi as Shin Hae-jun
41 years old, CEO of law firm Haejun, divorce attorney. She has crush on Yun-jae.
 Seo Bum-june as Lee Soo-jae
27 years old, 7th grade public exam preparation student, youngest brother, strong positive narcissism, doing a part-time job of loading and unloading at a parcel delivery service. He met Na Yu-na at his part time job.
 Choi Ye-bin as Na Yu-na
25 years old, she is the eldest of two sons and one daughter. She dreams of becoming a pastry chef, she  is working hard at a bakery academy and also working part-time as a courier.

Lee family
 Park In-hwan as Lee Kyeong-cheol 
79 years old, head of Igane, Min-ho's father, he worked hard as a fresh produce seller.
 Ji Seung-hyun as young Lee Kyeong-cheol
 Park Sang-won as Lee Min-ho
60 years old, Lee Kyeong-cheol's adopted son, Kyung-ae's husband, vice-principal of a middle school, father of 3 sons.
 Kim Hye-ok as Han Kyung-ae
60 years old, Min-ho's wife, mother of 3 sons.

Lee extended family
 Sunwoo Yong-nyeo as Lee Kyung-soon
76 years old, Lee Kyeong-cheol's younger sister, who immigrated to the Atlanta, United States but went bankrupt and came back to live with her brother.
 Jung Heung-chae as Choi Man-ri
58 years old, Lee Kyung-soon's son.
 Kim Ye-ryeong as Yoo Hye-yeong
55 years old, Choi Man-ri's wife. 
 Cha Yeop as Choi Seong-soo
35 years old, law firm manager in Hae-jun's law firm, Lee Hyun-jae's cousin.
 Hyun Jyu-ni as Lee So-ra 
35 years old, wife of Choi Seong-soo, She is a nursing assistant in Lee Yoon-jae's dental clinic. Lee So-ra married at an age of 20, and has three children.
 Kim Hyo-kyung as Choi Ha-neul
12 years old, the eldest daughter of Seong-soo and So-ra.
 Im Ye-jin as Choi Ba-da
10 years old, the second daughter of Seong-soo and So-ra.
 Kim So-min as Choi Hae
8 years old, the youngest son of Seong-soo and So-ra.

Hyun family
 Ban Hyo-jung as Yoon Jung-ja
80 years old, a successful restauranteur, anything she touched turned into money.
 Byun Woo-min as Hyun Jin-heon
57 years old, Yoon Jung-ja's son. Gimbap franchise and in love with his wife.
 Park Ji-young as Jin Su-jeong
53 years old, Hyun Jin-heon's wife. She lived a comfortable life and gave birth to a daughter and a son (Hyun Mi-rae and Hyun Jeong-hoo).
 Kim Kang-min as Hyun Jeong-hoo 
27 years old, Hyun Mi-rae's younger brother and Head of Bong Food headquarters. He has crush on Na Yu-na.

Others
 Hong Yo-seob as Na Seok-man, Yu-na's father
 Song Ok-sook as Sok Sook-suk, Yu-na's mother
 Lee Joo-shil as Jung Mi-young
77 years old, Su-jeong's mother.
 Choi Su-rin as Jin-ju 
 Su-jeong's sister-in-law.
 Kwak Hee-ju as Na Wan-ju 
 Na Yu-na's younger brother.
 Ahn Sang-eun as Satbyul 
Macaron shop owner and Yu-na.

Special appearances
 Bae Woo-hee as Yeon Na-young 
 Lee Hyun-jin as Park Jun-hyung 
 32 years old, party to the marriage annulment lawsuit.
 Kim Sun-woong as Bong Food worker
 Woo Hyun as Judiciary
 Kim Ji-min as The plaintiff filed for divorce.
 Bae Geu-rin as So Young-eun 
36 years old, ex-girlfriend of Hyun-jae, after breaking up with Lee Hyun-jae, she married the son of a semi-millionaire and followed each other's rules. 10 years later, the two reunited as lawyers and divorce clients.
 Yoon Bok-in as VIP client
 Lee Jung-hyuk as Jaehyun, So Young-eun's ex-husband.
 Nam Bo-ra as Kim Yu-jin, currently recommended playwrights.

Production
In August, it was reported that Yoon Shi-yoon has been offered role in the series and he was considering it positively. Director Kim Seong-geun directed a KBS weekend drama after 2006 weekend TV series Thank You, My Life and 2009 daily drama Jolly Widows. Park In-hwan and Shin Dong-mi are working together after 2019 TV series Liver or Die. Park In-hwan last appeared in KBS weekend drama Believe in Love in 2011. Kim Hye-ok is appearing in KBS weekend dramas fourth time. Previously, she joined in My Too Perfect Sons (2009), Seoyoung, My Daughter (2012) and My Golden Life (2017) with KBS.

On March 11, photos from script reading site were released revealing the site. Production presentation of the series was given by Oh Min-seok, Shin Dong-mi, Yoon Si-yoon, Bae Da-bin, Seo Bum-june, and Choi Ye-bin on April 1, 2022.

Original soundtrack

Part 1

Part 2

Part 3

Part 4

Part 5

Part 6

Part 7

Part 8

Part 9

Part 10

Part 11

Part 12

Part 13

Part 14

Part 15

Part 16

Part 17

Part 18

Part 19

Release and reception
It's Beautiful Now began  its first broadcast on KBS2 on April 2, 2022, and aired on every Saturday and Sunday at 20:00 (KST). As per Nielsen Korea, the 50th episode of the series logged 29.4% nationwide ratings. It also attracted 5.3 million viewers and as of September 18, 2022, it was placed at 12th rank among Top 50 series per nationwide viewers in Korea.

Viewership

Accolades

Notes

References

External links
  
  It's Beautiful Now at Naver 
 It's Beautiful Now at Daum 
 
 

Korean Broadcasting System television dramas
2022 South Korean television series debuts
2022 South Korean television series endings
Korean-language television shows
Television series about families
Television series by Drama House
Television series by Zium Content